Vlatava may refer to:

Vltava, the longest river in the Czech Republic.
A movement of Smetana's symphonic poem cycle Ma Vlast
Vlatava (comics), a fictional country in the DC Comics universe.